The Ambassador of Italy to Russia (in Russian: посол Италии в России) is Italy's foremost diplomatic representative in Russia, and head of the Italy's diplomatic mission in Russia. The current ambassador in charge since October 1, 2021 is Giorgio Starace.

List 

 Ferdinando Salleo, January 12, 1992 - May 12, 1993
 Federico Di Roberto, May 12, 1993 - February 1, 1996
 Emanuele Scammacca del Murgo e dell'Agnone, February 1, 1996 - June 22, 1999
 Giancarlo Aragona, June 22, 1999 - November 5, 2001
 Gianfranco Facco Bonetti, November 5, 2001 - April 22, 2006
 Vittorio Claudio Surdo, April 22, 2006 - December 2010
 Antonio Zanardi Landi, December 2010 - September 2013
 Cesare Maria Ragaglini, September 2013 - January 2018
 Pasquale Terracciano, January 2018 - October 1, 2021
 Giorgio Starace, October 1, 2021 - In charge

References

External links 

 Downloadable list of Italian ambassadors to Russia, (.doc), archived from the original, on ambmosca.esteri.it.

Lists of ambassadors of Italy
Lists of ambassadors to Russia
Ambassadors of Italy to Russia